The 2022 Major League Rugby season was the fifth season of Major League Rugby, the professional rugby union competition sanctioned by USA Rugby. The regular season began on February 5, 2022.

The Dallas Jackals made their debut this season, having postponed their inaugural season from 2021.

MLR added Television Match Officials (TMO) to assist in-game referees with making the correct decisions during all matches.

Teams and format

Regular season
The regular season consisted of 18 weeks, with each team playing 16 matches, beginning on February 5, 2022 and ending on June 5.

Standings

Matches
The following are the match results for the 2022 Major League Rugby regular season:

Updated to match(es) played on June 5, 2022 
Colors: Blue: home team win; Yellow: draw; Red: away team win.

Eastern Conference Extra Matches 

Updated to match(es) played on June 5, 2022 
Colors: Blue: home team win; Yellow: draw; Red: away team win.

Scheduled matches

Week 1 (February 5–6)

Week 2 (February 10–12)

Week 3 (February 18–20)

Week 4 (February 26–27)

Week 5 (March 4–6)

Week 6 (March 12–13)

Week 7 (March 19–20)

Week 8 (March 26–27)

Week 9 (April 1–3)

Week 10 (April 9–10)

Week 11 (April 15–16)

Week 12 (April 23–24)

Week 13 (April 30–May 1)

Week 14 (May 7–8)

Week 15 (May 13–15)

Week 16 (May 19–22)

Week 17 (May 27–29)

Week 18 (June 3–5)

Playoffs

Competition controversy
On June 7, due to breaches of the salary cap rules, Major League Rugby disqualified the two top teams in the Western Conference, the Austin Gilgronis and the LA Giltinis, from the playoffs. After the Seattle Seawolves defeated  the San Diego Legion in the Western Conference Eliminator, the Houston SaberCats hosted the Western Conference Final against the Seawolves at Starfire Stadium.

Eliminators (June 11)

Conference Finals (June 18–19)

Championship final (June 25)

Player statistics

Top scorers
The top ten try and point scorers during the 2022 Major League Rugby season were:

Last updated: June 26, 2022

Sanctions

End of Season Awards

The MLR introduced a new postseason award; the S. Marcus Calloway Community Impact Award, which honors the MLR player who has made a "positive impact in their community while exuding the values of the sport of rugby".

The award is named after the late S. Marcus Calloway, the former chairman and majority owner of Rugby ATL who died in December 2021. It will be awarded to the player who shows "passion, excellence and integrity on and off the field, inspires others to action, shows strength in character, aids those less fortunate, and embraces the core values of rugby, while displaying solidarity, discipline and respect". Each Major League Rugby team will nominate one player each year for the award, with a committee made up of MLR Commissioner George Killebrew, Deputy Commissioner Bill Goren and Marcus' widow Clea Calloway, selecting the winner from the 13 nominees. The winning player will be presented with a commemorative trophy and a $5,000 donation to the non-profit of their choice at the MLR Championship Final.

During the MLR Championship Final, it was announced that Andrew Quattrin of the Toronto Arrows was the recipient of the inaugural S. Marcus Calloway Community Impact Award. Quattrin was presented with a commemorative trophy and a $5,000 donation to his non-profit, Optimism Place.

Notes

References

Major League Rugby seasons
Major League Rugby
Major League Rugby
Major League Rugby